Estonian Judo Association (abbreviation EJL) is one of the sport governing bodies in Estonia which deals with judo.

EJL is established on 15 November 1998. EJL is a member of International Judo Federation (IJF).

References

External links
 

Sports governing bodies in Estonia
Martial arts in Estonia
National members of the International Judo Federation